The Jewish Cemeteries of Essaouira are in the city of Essaouira, Morocco. They include the old cemetery which is located by the sea and the new cemetery located opposite the old one.

The old cemetery 
The old cemetery, also called the marine cemetery, is separated from the ocean by a single wall. It has 2400 tombstones all made of rocky stones, the oldest of which date from 1775. Very visited because it hosts the mausoleum of Rabbi Ḥaim Pinto, the old cemetery served until around 1875 as the main cemetery of the city which had a large Jewish community.

The new cemetery 
The new cemetery was founded in 1892, located opposite the old one. However, in 2010, Edmond Amran El Maleh was buried in the old cemetery at his request.

References

External links
 

Cemeteries in Morocco
Jewish cemeteries
Essaouira